Alan Hardy is a former professional rugby league footballer who played in the 1970s and 1980s.

Playing career

County Cup Final appearances
Alan Hardy played left-, i.e. number 8, (replaced by interchange/substitute Paul Norton) in Castleford's 10-5 victory over Bradford Northern in the 1981 Yorkshire County Cup Final during the 1981–82 season at Headingley Rugby Stadium, Leeds, on Saturday 3 October 1981.

References

External links
Alan Hardy Memory Box Search at archive.castigersheritage.com

Living people
Castleford Tigers players
English rugby league players
Place of birth missing (living people)
Rugby league hookers
Rugby league props
Rugby league second-rows
Year of birth missing (living people)